The 1992 French Figure Skating Championships took place in Colombes for singles and pairs and in Bordeaux for ice dance. Skaters competed in the disciplines of men's singles, women's singles, pair skating, and ice dancing on the senior level. The event was used to help determine the French team to the 1992 Winter Olympics, the 1992 World Championships, and the 1992 European Championships.

Results

Men

Ladies

Pairs

Ice dance

External links
 French article

French Figure Skating Championships, 1992
1992 in French sport
French Figure Skating Championships